Lee Williams (born 27 October 1986 in Pontyberem, Wales) is a Welsh rugby union footballer who plays at scrum-half for the Scarlets and Wales Sevens, although he played on the wing during the Scarlets' injury crisis in 2008–09.

Williams signed for the Scarlets on a professional development contract in March 2006, having previously played for his hometown club, Pontyberem RFC, and UWIC RFC. Williams attended UWIC, studying for a Business Studies degree.

He was selected in the Wales Sevens squad for 2012-13

References

1986 births
Living people
Commonwealth Games rugby sevens players of Wales
Llanelli RFC players
Rugby sevens players at the 2010 Commonwealth Games
Rugby sevens players at the 2014 Commonwealth Games
Rugby union players from Carmarthenshire
Rugby union scrum-halves
Scarlets players
Welsh rugby union players